Eleni "Lela" Karagianni (1898 – 8 September 1944), also written Karayanni, was a Greek resistance leader during World War II. The wife of an Attican pharmacist and the mother of seven children, Karagianni worked to coordinate Greek resistance cells and their activities against the occupying Axis forces. Captured and tortured by the Germans in 1944, Karagianni was sent to Haidari concentration camp, where she continued to organize a resistance against the Germans. She was executed by firing squad on 8 September 1944.

Biography 
Lela Karagianni was born in Limni, Euboea. Prior to World War II, Karagianni was a housewife in Athens. Her husband was a pharmacist, and the couple together had seven children. When the Axis powers invaded and occupied Greece in 1941, the Karagiannis provided medicine to retreating British soldiers, and later helped some stranded soldiers escape the country. As the occupation continued, the family grew increasingly involved in the burgeoning resistance movement against the-then Italian occupiers of Athens; this eventually resulted in the Lela, her husband, and her older sons joining the National Republican Greek League, commonly known by its Greek acronym EDES. Lela formed her own cell within the wider movement, code-named "Bouboulina" in reference to her great grandmother Laskarina Bouboulina, a female Greek captain who had fought against the Ottoman Empire during the Greek War of Independence.

Karagianni and her fellow partisans operated out of her husband's pharmacy in Athens and from a monastery in Megara. The cell distributed information to other cells, smuggled wanted individuals into areas controlled by Greek partisan forces, and forged documents, and coordinated with British military intelligence to disrupt the Axis occupation.

In July 1944, Karagianni was arrested in Athens by the German occupation forces. She was taken to the SS headquarters on Merlin Street, known to some Greek prisoners as "Hell House". There, she was tortured for several days before being sent to Haidari concentration camp on the outskirts of Athens. While interned, Lela continued to coordinate a resistance effort against the Germans. However, she and other captured resistance members were executed by firing squad on the morning of 8 September 1944, just 34 days before Athens was liberated by Allied forces.

Legacy 

Following the war, Lela Karagianni and her family (her husband, daughters, and sons survived the war) were honored for their efforts during the conflict. A bust of Karagianni was commissioned by the Union of Greek Woman Scientists in 1963. In 2011 she was recognized as being Righteous Among Nations.

References 

1898 births
1944 deaths
National Republican Greek League members
Greek Righteous Among the Nations
Female resistance members of World War II
Greek people executed by Nazi Germany
Greek torture victims
People executed by Nazi Germany by firing squad
People from Euboea (regional unit)
Deaths by firearm in Greece